Hamadryas februa, the gray (or grey) cracker, is a species of cracker butterfly in the family Nymphalidae. It is found from Argentina north through tropical America to Mexico. Rare strays can be found up to the lower Rio Grande Valley in southern Texas. The habitat consists of subtropical forests, forest edges and cultivated areas with trees.

The wingspan is 70–86 mm. The upperside is mottled brown and white although there is some red in the forewing cell bar. The hindwing eyespots have orange scales preceding black crescents. The underside of the hindwings is white and the submarginal eyespots are composed of a brown ring around a black crescent in a white center. Adults are on wing year round in the tropics and from August to October in southern Texas. They feed on sap and rotting fruit.

The larvae feed on Dalechampia and Tragia species. They are solitary and build resting platforms out of dung pellets.

Subspecies
Hamadryas februa februa (Brazil, Paraguay, Peru)
Hamadryas februa ferentina (Godart, [1824]) (southern Texas, Mexico, Honduras, Trinidad) – Ferentina calico

References

External links 
butterfliesandmoths.org

Hamadryas (butterfly)
Butterflies described in 1823
Butterflies of North America
Nymphalidae of South America